Corinne Narassiguin (born March 7, 1975, in Le Port, Réunion) is a French politician and former member of the National Assembly of France.  She was elected on the 17 June 2012, in the 2012 legislative election, representing the North American constituency of French residents abroad. She represented the Socialist Party and the Greens.

Personal life
Corinne Narassiguin was born in Saint Paul, in the French overseas department of Réunion, into a family of left-leaning teachers. She graduated from Telecom & Management SudParis and earned a Master's degree in telecommunications from University College London. She has been a resident in the United States since 1999. She said her interest in politics grew during the 2000 US Elections.  Before her election Corinne worked for a major US bank.

Political life
Narassiguin joined the New York City branch of the Socialist Party and was its secretary from 2003 until 2009. In 2005 she was elected to the regional executive committee where she handled international affairs after co-authoring a paper about modernising the life of the party.

2009 and 2010 Assembly of French Citizens Abroad Election
She was Christiane Ciccone's running mate in the 2009 Assembly of French Citizens Abroad election and was elected as the second candidate of the Socialist Party slate. However, another candidate who did not get elected sued to get the election invalidated. Christiane Ciccone and Corinne Narassiguin were reelected in 2010.  She was once again elected in the subsequent re-run of the election.  She later became one of the two vice-presidents of the Laws and Regulations Committee at the Assembly of French Citizens Abroad.

2012 Legislative Election

She was the first declared candidate, having started campaigning in December 2010. In March 2012, she announced that some of her objectives were to encourage international mobility and to foster a debate over changes to the labor laws. The same month, she said her two main "themes" were education and social matters, advocating for the establishment of a consular social benefit based on the revenu de solidarité active and universal healthcare. She was elected on the second round with 54% of the votes. 
On February 15, 2013 her election was invalidated by France's highest constitutional court for accounting irregularities and she was banned from public office for 12 months.

References

External links
 
 
  Corinne Narassiguin on French Morning

1975 births
Living people
People from Le Port, Réunion
Politicians of Réunion
Socialist Party (France) politicians
Deputies of the 14th National Assembly of the French Fifth Republic
Women members of the National Assembly (France)
21st-century French women politicians
French engineers